Beverley Jones (born 17 October 1974) is a Paralympian from Wales competing in category F37 throwing events. Jones won a bronze medal at the 2006 Commonwealth Games as an EAD in the 100m sprint. Jones has qualified for four Summer Paralympics from 2000 to 2012 finishing fourth twice, in the sprint in 2000 at Sydney and in the shot put at Athens in 2004.

History
Jones was born in Queensferry, Flintshire in north Wales in 1974. Jones, who has cerebral palsy, first began playing representative sports when she played cricket for Wales, and was in the team that beat England at Lords in 1996. She was introduced to athletics at the Wrexham Sports Club for the Disabled in 1997 and began entering sprinting events in her 1998. In 2000, she was selected for the Great Britain team at the Summer Paralympics, competing in the T38 sprint. She finished 4th in the 100m and 8th in the 200m.

In 2004 Jones was reselected for the Great Britain Paralympic team for the Summer games in Athens, this time qualifying as F38 for the combined F37/38 shot put, finishing just outside the medals in fourth place. She was reclassified to the higher disability grade of F37 after the competition. In the 2005 CP World Championships in Connecticut, USA she took gold in the shot put, 100m and 200m sprints. At the 2006 IPC World Athletics Championships in Assen, Netherlands, she set a F37 shot put world record of 10.57m. Jones was still combining her shot put with sprinting when she was chosen to represent Wales at the 2006 Commonwealth Games. Since the Manchester Games in 2002, the Commonwealth Games had introduced a limited number of events for elite athletes with a disability. The only T37 event at the Games was women's sprinting, for which Jones qualified, winning the bronze medal in the final.

As of the 2008 Paralympics in Beijing, Jones began concentrating on throwing events, mainly discus and shot put. She qualified for both events in China, finishing 5th in the T37 Shot Put and 7th in the T37 discus with a European record throw of 27.27m. Her 5th place in shot put saw Jones throwing her personal best of 10.35m.

In 2011 Jones represented Great Britain in both the Shot and discus at the IPC Athletics World Championships in New Zealand. She threw a European record in the discus of 30.62m, but was unable to beat Na Mi of China, and finished in second place, taking silver.

2012 saw Jones qualify for Great Britain at her fourth Paralympic Games, on this occasion in the F37 shot put and the F37 discus at London. In her first event, the shot put, she threw 9.85m to end in seventh place. Later in the Games, on 6 September at the London Olympic Stadium, she recorded a distance of 30.99m in the discus which gave Jones a bronze medal, her first Paralympic podium finish.

Jones qualified for the 2016 Paralympic Games in F37 discus and placed 5th with a throw of 28.53m.

References

External links
 

Living people
1974 births
Track and field athletes with disabilities
Welsh female shot putters
British female discus throwers
British female shot putters
Welsh female sprinters
People from Queensferry, Flintshire
Sportspeople from Flintshire
Paralympic athletes of Great Britain
Paralympic bronze medalists for Great Britain
Medalists at the 2012 Summer Paralympics
Athletes (track and field) at the 2000 Summer Paralympics
Athletes (track and field) at the 2004 Summer Paralympics
Athletes (track and field) at the 2008 Summer Paralympics
Athletes (track and field) at the 2012 Summer Paralympics
Commonwealth Games bronze medallists for Wales
Commonwealth Games medallists in athletics
Athletes (track and field) at the 2006 Commonwealth Games
Sportswomen with disabilities
Welsh female discus throwers
Welsh Paralympic competitors
Paralympic medalists in athletics (track and field)
Medallists at the 2006 Commonwealth Games